Yang Huiyan (born 1981) is a Chinese-born Cypriot billionaire businesswoman and property developer. She is the majority shareholder of Country Garden Holdings,  a stake largely transferred to her by her father Yang Guoqiang in 2007. She was previously the richest woman in Asia.

Her father Yang Guoqiang started the real estate company Country Garden in 1997 and transferred 70% of Country Garden's shares to her before its IPO in 2007. Country Garden's initial offering raised about $1.6 billion, or as much as Google raised in 2004 in the United States. As of August 2021, Yang had a net worth of US$27.3 billion. Yang is vice chairman of the board's governance committee and helped raise $410 million selling new shares in 2014, according to Forbes.

Yang is a 2003 graduate of Bachelor of Arts/Science, Ohio State University where she was a member of The National Society of Collegiate Scholars (NSCS).

According to leaked documents dubbed as "The Cyprus Papers", Yang obtained Cypriot citizenship in 2018, though China does not recognize dual nationality. As of October 2020, Yang's passport status remains uncertain, following the Cyprus governments suspension of the passport scheme. In June 2022, she was recognized by the International Hospitality Institute on the Global 100 in Hospitality, a list featuring the 100 Most Powerful People in Global Hospitality.

She lost more than half of her net worth during the 2020–2022 Chinese property sector crisis.

References

1981 births
Living people
Billionaires from Guangdong
Businesspeople from Guangdong
Chinese real estate businesspeople
Female billionaires
Ohio State University alumni
People from Foshan
Cypriot billionaires
Cypriot businesspeople
Naturalized citizens of Cyprus
Cypriot people of Chinese descent
21st-century Chinese businesswomen
21st-century Chinese businesspeople
21st-century Cypriot businesspeople